William Edward White (6 October 1916 – 3 October 1990) was an Australian rules footballer who played with Richmond in the Victorian Football League (VFL). White came to Richmond from Bendigo club Sandhurst. He played in eight senior games for Richmond in the 1941 VFL season. Later, in 1947, White was involved in a four-way tie for the Bendigo Football League's best and fairest award.

References

External links

1916 births
1990 deaths
Richmond Football Club players
Sandhurst Football Club players
Australian rules footballers from Bendigo